Bertie Brosnan is an Irish screenwriter, film producer, actor and screen director.

He was born in Tralee, the capital of County Kerry, in the Republic of Ireland.

Education 
Bertie did his leaving certificate with Mercy Secondary School, Mounthawk in 2002. He went onto study Civil Engineering in the Institute of Technology, Tralee obtaining a Higher Certificate in 2005.

Bertie started part-time theatre performance training with the Gaiety School of Acting in late 2008 and went on to take classes in screen acting with the school in 2009. He continued his screen acting training in 2010 with Company D Theatre Company and David Scott in Dublin. Bertie also trained with Improv Olympic in Hollywood and renowned coach Doug Warhit while visiting the United States in 2011.

Film and Television Work

Acting 
Bertie made his Television acting debut on TG4's television programme Marú in 2010. He landed acting roles in various films such as Chemical 13 a horror short film from producer Guillermo Arredondo at Garredondo Productions.

Bertie was cast in another horror short film called Prey which was written & directed by the award-winning director Randal Plunkett who is the current Lord Dunsany. Next was a dystopian war feature film titled Guerrilla produced by Lord Dunsany & directed by Blaine Rennicks the award-winning cinematographer for Bertie's film Sineater.

Later, Bertie gained roles on an RTÉ/Filmbase funded short film Empty, and, he landed other cameo roles throughout the years including a Horror feature film Brackenmore produced by Caragh Lake Films and distributed by Amazon's Prime Video.

Writing & Directing 

Bertie began writing screenplays early on in his career and his script Oh, the Accent! came to fruition in 2012 with Bertie starring in the lead role. Oh, the Accent! was aired on Planet 3 TV in 2012. Bertie's professional directorial debut came with his short film Jacob Wrestling With The Angel in 2013. The next year he went on to write & direct his second short film titled Sineater. Both films screened at international film festivals in Ireland and overseas.

Sineater & Jacob Wrestling With The Angel went to market at the Cannes Short Film Corner and gained worldwide deals with Shorts TV & SoFy.TV. Off the back of that success, Bertie won a film bursary from Cork City Arts in 2016, and produced two more arthouse short films Forgotten Paradise & Last Service. Mark Ziobro, a popular online critic from The Movie Buff said of Bertie's films, "Brosnan has presented a series of films that do what independent films do best – they make us think, they make us feel, they make us question."

In the summer of 2016, production began on Bertie's feature film called Con, and it premiered at Kerry Film Festival in 2018. The Dublin Inquirer said that "Con is a view into a potential filmmaking disaster. Brosnan’s film shows the unmaking of a documentary, alongside the descending fortunes of its subject."

Producing 

From here, Bertie began branching out as producer into new genres with other collaborators. He co-produced an RTÉ-funded short film by the popular comedy troupe CCCahoots Productions in 2017. Next up, Bertie was drafted in by    Locked In The Attic Productions to help develop and produce the Award-Winning feature film Misty Button which began its run of festivals in 2019. Also in 2019, Bertie became an associate producer of the controversial documentary Troll Inc highlighting the birth of internet trolling as we know it today.

References

External links 
 

Living people
1985 births